FMN, abbreviated from Forget Me Not, is a 24 hours teledrama channel, the first one in Indonesia, formerly known as Vision 2 Drama or Televiva. The channel was launched in 2005, and broadcast by MNC Vision. All programs are dubbed in Indonesian. Originally, the channel shows teledramas from Asia, Latin America, Korea and Taiwan, however, after rebranding as FMN, the channel now focuses on showing Latin American and Turkish teledramas. It is owned as a joint venture by Israeli company Dori Media Group and Sony Pictures Television.

Television Dramas

2005 
 Rincon De Luz (Ended March 2005 - March 2006)
 La Venganza (Ended June 2005 - January 2006)
 Topacio (Ended January 2005 - July 2005)
 Vale Todo (Ended January 2005 - September 2005)
 Angel Rebelde (Ended August 2005 - March 2006)
 Aquamarina (Ended April 2005 - September 2005)
 La Mujer De Mi Vida (Ended January 2005 - Oktober 2005)
 Guajira (Ended February 2005 - December 2005)
 Azul Tequila (Ended July 2005 - December 2005)
 Gitanas (Ended September 2005 - April 2006)
 Enamorada (Ended January 2005 - April 2005)
 La Mujer de Judas (Ended September 2005 - June 2006)

2006 
 Machos (Ended March 2006 - October 2006)
 Gata Salvaje (Ended February 2006 - February 2007)

2008 
 Lalola (Ended March 2008 - October 2008)
 Gata Salvaje (Ended November 2008 - November 2009)

References

External links 
Indovision Web Site

Sony Pictures Television
Television stations in Indonesia
Television channels and stations established in 2005